Zurabi Datunashvili (born 18 June 1991) is a Georgian-born Serbian  Greco-Roman wrestler who competes in the men's middleweight category.

Career
He won a silver medal in the same weight division at the 2013 European Wrestling Championships, coincidentally in his home city Tbilisi, losing out to defending Olympic champion Roman Vlasov of Russia.

Datunashvili represented Georgia at the 2012 Summer Olympics in London, where he competed in the men's 74 kg class. He defeated South Korea's Kim Jin-Hyeok, and United States' Ben Provisor in the preliminary rounds, before losing out the quarterfinal match to Azerbaijan's Emin Ahmadov, with a three-set technical score (3–0, 0–3, 0–4), and a classification point score of 1–3.

In World Wrestling Championships 2014 for bronze medal in the 75 kg he lost to Elvin Mursaliyev of Azerbaijan (1—1).

At the 2016 Summer Olympics, he was knocked out in the first round by Doszhan Kartikov.
In November 2016, Datunashvili was disqualified from the 2016 European Cup of Nations after engaging in a mid-match fist fight with his Russian opponent, Imil Sharafetdinov, who was also disqualified. The fist fight descended into a brawl after the two wrestlers' coaches, as well as several fans, joined the melee. "The guys just failed to cope with their emotions, but they swiftly calmed themselves down and were shaking hands several minutes afterward," Gogi Koguashvili, the head coach of the Russian national wrestling team, later remarked.

In 2018, Datunashvili accused the Georgian Wrestling Federation of favoritism and corruption. On 11 January 2019, he was assaulted by Gega Gegeshidze, the president of the Georgian Wrestling Federation, following a match with Robert Kobliashvili which Datunashvili lost by referee's decision. The incident was captured on video. "I don't want him [Gegeshidze] to be arrested, I want him to resign," Datunashvili later told Radio Free Europe/Radio Liberty. "He's not man enough to speak the truth, but I feel that truth will prevail. Everyone saw that he hit me with a blunt metal object of some kind." On 20 January, the Georgian Police announced they were opening an investigation into the incident.

In 2020, he won one of the bronze medals in the 87 kg event at the Individual Wrestling World Cup held in Belgrade, Serbia.
In 2021, he won a bronze medal in Tokyo, at the Olympic games for the Serbian national team.

In 2022, he won the silver medal in his event at the Vehbi Emre & Hamit Kaplan Tournament held in Istanbul, Turkey. He won the gold medal in the 87kg event at the 2022 World Wrestling Championships held in Belgrade, Serbia.

References

External links

 Profile at National Wrestling Federation of Georgia 

1991 births
Living people
Serbian people of Georgian descent
Serbian male sport wrestlers
Male sport wrestlers from Georgia (country)
Olympic wrestlers of Georgia (country)
Olympic wrestlers of Serbia
Olympic bronze medalists for Serbia
Olympic medalists in wrestling
Wrestlers at the 2012 Summer Olympics
Wrestlers at the 2016 Summer Olympics
Wrestlers at the 2020 Summer Olympics
Medalists at the 2020 Summer Olympics
European Wrestling Champions
European Wrestling Championships medalists
European champions for Serbia
European Games competitors for Georgia (country)
Wrestlers at the 2015 European Games
Sportspeople from Tbilisi
Naturalized citizens of Serbia
World Wrestling Champions